The white-lined broad-nosed bat (Platyrrhinus lineatus) is a bat species found in southern and eastern Brazil, Paraguay, Uruguay, northern Argentina, Bolivia, Peru, Ecuador, Colombia, French Guiana and Suriname.

References

White-lined Broad-nosed Bat
White-lined Broad-nosed
White-lined Broad-nosed
Mammals of Argentina
Mammals of Bolivia
Mammals of Colombia
Mammals of Paraguay
Mammals of Peru
Mammals of Uruguay
White-lined broad-nosed bat
White-lined broad-nosed bat